Saleh Al Menhali (Arabic:صالح المنهالي) (born 1 January 1984) is an Emirati footballer plays for Baynounah .

External links

References

Emirati footballers
1984 births
Living people
Al Wahda FC players
Al Dhafra FC players
Baniyas Club players
Baynounah SC players
UAE Pro League players
UAE First Division League players
UAE Second Division League players
Association football forwards